Bally's Atlantic City is a casino hotel on the boardwalk in Atlantic City, New Jersey. It is owned and operated by Bally's Corporation. The Marlborough-Blenheim Hotel stood on the site before the casino was built. It is famous for its address of "Park Place and the Boardwalk", two locations popularized by the board game Monopoly. Bally's is one of the largest hotels on the boardwalk with nearly 1,169 rooms. Its historic Dennis Tower was constructed in stages between 1906 and 1929. In 1997, The Wild Wild West Casino was opened as an expansion of Bally's.

History

First hotels on the site
The site now occupied by Bally's was originally the location of two separate hotels: the Marlborough-Blenheim Hotel and the Dennis Hotel.

The Marlborough House was built in 1900 by Josiah White III between Ohio Avenue and Park Place on the Boardwalk, in the Queen Anne style. White expanded the successful resort in 1905, hiring Philadelphia architect Will Price of Price and McLanahan to design a new, separate wing, built entirely of concrete, which opened in 1906 as the Blenheim. The hotel was then renamed the Marlborough-Blenheim.

The Dennis Hotel began as a pre-Civil War cottage along Michigan Avenue, built by William Dennis. After the war, it was acquired by Joseph H. Borton, who extended the hotel and then built a large addition in 1892, in the French chateau style. The hotel was sold to Walter Buzby just after the turn of the twentieth century. Buzby hired Philadelphia architect Walter Smedley a fellow Quaker, to design a huge new six-story eastern wing, which was completed in 1906. It is the oldest portion still standing. In 1910, the 1892 Michigan Avenue west wing was demolished and replaced with a larger six-story wing, also designed by Smedley. In 1925, Buzby had Smedley design a huge ten-story rear wing, containing a new lobby and ballrooms, which would connect the eastern and western wings extending to the Boardwalk. In 1929, with Smedley's practice having closed, Buzby hired another Philadelphia Quaker firm, Price and Walton, to design a seven-story addition to the 1910 Michigan Avenue west wing, which extended it seventy feet toward the ocean, bringing it even with the 1906 wing. This gave the Dennis its current form. 

In 1969, the Buzby family sold the Dennis for $4 million to Gary and Lewis Malamut, owners of the adjacent Shelbourne Hotel. When they defaulted on the mortgage in 1975, the hotel was returned to the Buzby family. It was soon after foreclosed by the First National Bank of South Jersey.

Bally's Park Place (1979–2000)
On March 14, 1977, wealthy, flamboyant art dealer Reese Palley and local attorney and businessman Martin Blatt purchased the Marlborough-Blenheim from the White family. They intended to spend $35 million on renovations, preserving the Blenheim wing, while razing the Marlborough to make way for a modern casino hotel. Palley successfully got the Blenheim wing placed on the National Register of Historic Buildings. In June 1977, Bally Manufacturing, the world's largest producer of slot machines, leased the Marlborough-Blenheim from Palley and Blatt for 40 years, with an option for a further 100 years. On August 17, 1977, Bally announced that it had purchased the neighboring Dennis Hotel for $4 million from the First National Bank of South Jersey. On October 25, 1977, Josiah White IV, grandson of the Marlborough-Blenheim's founder, presided over the closure of that hotel, locking its front door.

After Bally took control of the two properties, it announced plans to raze all three hotel buildings - the Marlborough, the Blenheim, and the Dennis, despite protests, to make way for the new "Bally's Park Place Casino and Hotel", an $83 million casino/hotel designed by California-based Maxwell Starkman Associates. The new resort was to have a 39-story, octagonal hotel tower and a huge three-level podium, containing a 75,000 square-foot casino, along with other resort and convention facilities. However, in an effort to offset costs and open the casino as soon as possible, the Dennis Hotel was retained to serve as the temporary hotel for Bally's until a new tower could be built.

In November 1978, Bally demolished the Marlborough-Blenheim and quickly cleared the land to begin building Bally's Park Place Casino. On December 30, 1979, the casino opened with the newly renovated Dennis serving as its hotel. In 1989, Bally constructed a 750-room hotel tower in a modern style, with an exterior of light pink glass. On July 2, 1997, The Wild Wild West Casino opened as the second casino at Bally's.

Bally's Atlantic City (2000–present)
In 2000, Bally's Park Place changed its name and became Bally's Atlantic City. The adjacent Claridge Hotel and Casino was purchased and incorporated into Bally's in 2003, and was renamed the Claridge Tower. The casino in the Claridge Tower was named The Ridge. The casino was renovated in 2008 from a standard casino floor to an upscale lounge-casino.

In 2005, Harrah's Entertainment (later Caesars Entertainment) purchased Bally's along with Caesars. In 2008, Harrah's spent $38.5 million to purchase the row of shops between the Dennis Tower and the boardwalk, and then spent a further $23 million to demolish the shops and restore the open plaza, and to restore the facade of the Dennis Tower and renovate its rooms.

In 2012, The Ridge closed its gambling and food amenities. The tower's 500 hotel rooms continued to be used for Bally's guests until it was sold in 2013 to be reopened as the independent Claridge Hotel.

In October 2017, ownership of Bally's was transferred to Vici Properties as part of a corporate spin-off, and the property was leased back to Caesars Entertainment.

In April 2020, Twin River Worldwide Holdings (now Bally's Corporation) agreed to buy Bally's Atlantic City from Vici. The deal excluded the Wild Wild West Casino which contains a sports betting facility, and operations would be transferred to Caesars Atlantic City. Twin River also announced that they would acquire a license to give Bally's their own sports book, online sports betting, and I-Gaming. The sale was completed in November 2020.  

As a condition of New Jersey casino license approval, Bally's Corporation, during the first two years ownership, started to implement the expenditure of over $90 million for property improvements. These included renovations to 750 hotel rooms, additional suites and penthouse, remodeled high-betting table games room, 400 new slot machines, and remodeled hotel lobby. An addition to the lobby was the Carousel Bar, a stationary circular lounge and bar, in which a bar top and its adjacent seats slowly rotate 360° for a ride-like experience. In the Courtyard adjacent to the Boardwalk was a new entertainment venue, The Yard. It includes a versatile transparent structure with a retractable roof, which stands between indoor and outdoor seating. "Bally's Legend’s VIP Beach", an addition to the existing seasonal beach bar, is exclusively for top level casino players.

Gaming
Table games include Blackjack, Baccarat, Craps, Roulette, Spanish 21, Let it Ride, and Pai Gow Tiles. Specialty games and poker variations known as "Carnival Games" include Mississippi Stud, 3-Card Poker, 4-Card Poker, Heads Up Hold’em, High Card Flush, and Pai Gow Poker. Recent developments include games which combine the features of live table games with those of slot machines: The multi-player Roulette automatically spins the ball, but the bet and payout function is mostly handle by computerized video terminals for each player. A similar multi-player machine throws a pair of large caps dice. Bally's also has a FanDuel sportsbook which offers sports betting. As provided by local and state law, there scattered areas where smoking is permitted, totaling 25% of the official gaming space. (Aside from this exception, smoking is banned by law throughout the rest of the casino and hotel). Under New Jersey law, persons under 21 years of age are not permitted to gamble. They may only pass through the main aisles of the casino when accompanied by someone over 21 years old to cross between hotel areas and exits, and may not stop or slow down to observe the games.

Up until February 2021, Bally's Atlantic City participated along with other Caesars Entertainment properties in the "Caesars Rewards" loyalty program for their players, guests, and other customers. Rewards were based on casino play, food/beverage/retail/hotel room/entertainment purchases, and other factors. There were four tiers of membership, increasing in status: Gold, Platinum, Diamond, and Seven Star.

After the sale of Bally's to Bally's Corporation, formerly Twin River Worldwide Holdings, Bally's has since transitioned to its own loyalty program — Bally's Players Club.

The Wild Wild West Casino

Opened on July 2, 1997, as an expansion of Bally's Atlantic City, it was originally extensively themed to the American Old West, with waterfalls, faux gold mines, and a running stream. It is notable for being one of the only fully themed casinos on the East Coast. The exterior features a facade made to resemble an old western town, while the inside featured a large mountain and other western town facades. The western theme has since been toned down in favor of a party atmosphere in order to attract a younger demographic.

Renovations to the Wild Wild West Casino began in June 2012 and were completed on February 21, 2014. The Virginia City Buffet was closed, and the casino floor area was reduced in size; for a period of time in 2012, all live table games and most slot machines were removed. Table games returned to the casino with the completion of renovations, occupying the newly renovated back area. A World Series of Poker-branded poker room allows simultaneous live and online play. A new stage for live entertainment was also part of the renovations.

Further renovations occurred in 2015 and 2016. The animatronic gold miner and large rock formation/waterfall near the main boardwalk entrance were removed; this space now features a large area for bands to perform, as well as some live table games. The only slot machines besides those in Coyote Kate's Slot Parlor are located near the new stage. The area between the stage and the far back poker rooms remains vacant, but plans may still be in the works for more to be added.

On President's Day weekend 2016, Bally's opened the new Boardwalk Saloon. The bar offers ceiling to floor windows with views of the boardwalk and beach and an entrance with accordion folding glass doors which can remain open for access to outdoor seating on the Boardwalk. It replaced the Rita's and the North entrance to the casino.

The Wild Wild West casino was not included in Vici Properties November 18, 2020 sale of Bally's Atlantic City to Twin River Worldwide Holdings (later renamed Bally's Corporation). Vici retained the property, to continue be run under Caesars Entertainment as operating license holder, but as part of Caesars Atlantic City. Other than an indoor connection to the Wild Wild West, Bally's Atlantic City, under its new ownership, has no affiliation with the property.

Dining
 Casino Cafe & Grille (6th Level)
 Jerry Longo's Meatballs and Martinis (6th Level)
 Dunkin' Donuts (in the main lobby, 24 hours)
 Guy Fieri's Chophouse (6th Level)
 Johnny Rockets (Boardwalk area)
 Red Bowl 88 (main casino area)
 The Yard (Courtyard adjacent to the Boardwalk)

Food court
Taste of the Shore is a food court in the "Gateway" area between the hotel lobby and the Claridge Hotel. It comprises:
 Sack O' Subs
 Carluccio's Pizza

Amenities 
The 6th level contains ballroom space and several meeting rooms. On the same level is a business center with computer/office machine access, and a Starbucks vending machine.

Bars, lounges, and nightclubs
 Bally's Beach Bar (On the beach in front of the main casino; weekends during summer months only)
 The bar/lounge at Guy Fieri's Chophouse (6th Level)
 Carousel Bar (Hotel Lobby)
 The bar at The Yard (Courtyard adjacent to the Boardwalk)

Shopping
There are a few stores in the complex:
 Studio (Gateway)
 The Gift Shop (hotel lobby)
 The Spa Pro Shop (8th level)

Spa, pool, and fitness
Bally's Atlantic City contains the Spa at Bally's featuring an indoor heated swimming pool, six hot tubs, two saunas, basketball and racquetball courts, a gym, and a large outdoor deck with views of the ocean all located on the 8th level.

Events

Sports
Boxing matches are held at the casino.

Hotel towers
Bally's has three hotel towers:
Bally's Tower is the largest and is the main tower. It was opened in 1989 after a long construction phase. This is the premier tower at Bally's, featuring some of the nicest rooms, like the penthouse and executive suites. The foundation for this tower, as well as a second tower (yet to be constructed) was built in the initial construction phase of the casino, executive offices, and restaurant building on the site of the demolished Marlboro-Blenheim Hotels. 
Dennis Tower was built in stages between 1906-1929 and was the original hotel at Bally's. 
Garden Tower was built in the mid-1980s and is located on top of the bus center/valet parking garage. Originally built as the "Garden Rooms", its accommodations were the first totally new hotel rooms in the complex. This is technically a low-rise building built atop the parking structure.

See also 

Bally's Las Vegas
Gambling in New Jersey

References

External links

 Official website 

Casinos in Atlantic City, New Jersey
Casinos completed in 1979
Hotel buildings completed in 1979
Hotels established in 1979
Skyscraper hotels in Atlantic City, New Jersey
Boxing venues in Atlantic City, New Jersey
Caesars Entertainment
1979 establishments in New Jersey
Casino hotels